The Wehrmacht is a 5 part documentary that provides differentiated answers on the Wehrmacht role in the World War II based on the latest historical and comprehensive investigative research, bringing many new facts to light, among them documents proving for the first time ever, what many among the officers actually thought from Trent Park operation archives.

Episode list
 The Blitzkrieg
 The Turning Point
 The Crimes
 Resistance
 To the Bitter End

References

External links
 

Documentary television series about World War II
German military television series